is a Japanese former sports shooter. He competed in the 50 metre pistol event at the 1968 Summer Olympics.

References

1934 births
Living people
Japanese male sport shooters
Olympic shooters of Japan
Shooters at the 1968 Summer Olympics
Sportspeople from Osaka